Thiratoscirtus obudu is a species of jumping spider in the genus Thiratoscirtus that lives in Nigeria. The species is named after Obudu, where it was first seen. It was first described in 2011.

References

Endemic fauna of Nigeria
Fauna of Nigeria
Salticidae
Spiders of Africa
Spiders described in 2011